Giliw Ko (My Love) is a 1939 Filipino film. A musical romance, Giliw Ko had a radio theme, and was the first production of the Filipino company, LVN Pictures. The restored film is notable for being a gift from Australia to the Filipino people to commemorate 100 years of independence. It was directed and written by Carlos Vander Tolosa, and starred Mila del Sol, Fernando Poe, Sr., Ely Ramos and Fleur de Lis. The film made a milestone by being the first to show a woman in a bathing suit worn by Fleur de Lis (now known as Mona Lisa).

Synopsis
The film tells the tale of Guia, a country girl played by Mila del Sol, who begins to sing American songs on the radio, after being infatuated with images of Hollywood and the attention lavished on her by the son of the wealthy hacienda owner. Actor Ely Ramos plays the son who is also the bandleader of the orchestra.  She finds fame and moves to Manila.  Eventually, she becomes disillusioned, and returns to the province, singing Filipino music. She also returns to the arms of her childhood sweetheart (played by Fernando Poe, Sr).

Cast
Fernando Poe Sr. as Jose
Mila del Sol as Guia
Ely Ramos as Antonio Lopez
Fleur de Lis as Rosie
Ben Rubio as Mang Takio
Precioso Palma as Don Alvaro
Cecilia Joaquin as Mang Juan
Viva Ortega as Doña Lucia
Nieves Obieta as Atang
SSS Trio as Themselves

Restoration
In 1998, the Australian government offered a restoration of the single remaining 16mm print to commemorate the Philippines' 100th year of independence.  The Philippine Information Agency and the National Film and Sound Archive in Canberra (both members of SEAPAVAA, the South East Asia-Pacific Audio Visual Archive Association) worked together on the restoration.

In 2022, the ABS-CBN Film Restoration Project is currently undergoing a new scan of the film print that was previously restored in 1998.

External links
Times Film Festival review and background

1939 films
Philippine black-and-white films
1930s romantic musical films
Philippine romantic musical films